Being a country that has a largely rural and agriculture-based industry, animal husbandry plays an important role in the economy of Pakistan and is a major source of livelihood for many farmers. It is estimated that there are between 30 and 35 million people in Pakistan's current labour force who are engaged in livestocks. While the agricultural practice is prevalent throughout the entire country, it is more common in the fertile provinces of Punjab and Sindh, which are traditionally the main areas of agriculture and farming activity. In 2020, the livestock industry was contributing 60.6 % to overall agriculture and 11.7 % to the GDP.

As of 2020, there were approximately 41.2 million buffaloes, 49.6 million cattle, 5.4 million donkeys, 78.2 million goats and 30.9 million sheep in Pakistan. Commercial poultry numbered 170.1 million broilers and 10.36 million layers in 1999. There were also 108 million poultry kept and tamed by people.

Sheep differ widely throughout the grazing lands of central and northern Pakistan. Their wool is exported in large quantities. Among local cow breeds, the most notable are the Red Sindhi cattle and the Sahiwal Breed, used widely for milk and dairy production purposes. Dung excreted by cattle is a vital resource for supplying cooking fuel and soil fertilizers.

The production of dairy product items such as milk, ice cream, cheeses and butter is carried out by dairy plants. During the period of 1984 to 1990, national milk production experienced a 41% increase while meat production surged by 48%.

Animals are also widely used for transport in Pakistan, especially in the rural areas; the most commonly used animals are camels, donkeys and bullocks. Challenges faced by modern poultry in Pakistan include high mortality rates and incidences of disease among chicks as well as an inefficient marketing system. The livestock industry remains neglected and underdeveloped when compared to its full socio-economic potential. The government of Pakistan has been embarking on various development projects, with the assistance of the Asian Development Bank, to improve the livestock industry and its efficiency.

See also
 Landhi Dairy Colony

References

Further reading
 Pakistan: Animal Husbandry and Veterinary Science by Hasimoglu, Sumer